Statistics of Swedish football Division 2 for the 1961 season.

League standings

Norrland

Svealand

Västra Götaland

Östra Götaland

Allsvenskan promotion playoffs

Footnotes

References
Sweden - List of final tables (Clas Glenning)

Swedish Football Division 2 seasons
2
Sweden
Sweden